Valkenburg aan de Geul is a municipality situated in the southeastern Dutch province of Limburg. The name refers to the central town in the municipality, Valkenburg, and the small river Geul passing through it.

History
Sieges and conquests have been the recurrent theme in the history of Valkenburg, especially in connection with Valkenburg castle, seat of the counts of Valkenburg (or Falkenburg). In December 1672 the castle was once again destroyed by Dutch troops led by William III, trying to prevent the armies of Louis XIV of France from capturing it, this time not to be rebuilt.

In the 19th century, because of the natural environment of the area, Valkenburg became a holiday destination for the well-to-do in the Netherlands. Tourism developed, especially after in 1853 the railway from Maastricht to Heerlen and Aachen opened. Valkenburg railway station is the oldest surviving station in the Netherlands. In the beginning of the 20th century, Dutch architect Pierre Cuypers lived in Valkenburg for several years. He helped develop tourism by designing a hotel, an open-air theater and a copy of the catacombs of Rome. He also restored the medieval church and designed several tombs and a chapel in Gothic Revival style in a graveyard situated on Cauberg, a steep hill outside the town center.

During the Second World War Valkenburg was occupied by Nazi-Germany for four years, four months and one week. The town was liberated on 17 September 1944 by the American 30th Infantry Division. They were greeted with tulips and bread.  For an overview of the resistance movement in Valkenburg during the war, see Valkenburg resistance.

Valkenburg is no longer a fortified town but it has largely retained its historical charm, although the town suffered heavily from mass tourism in the 1960s, 70s and 80s. The municipality of Valkenburg aan de Geul still hosts more than 1 million overnight stays a year. The present aim of the council of Valkenburg is to move away from mass tourism and emphasize "the natural and historical beauty of the town". In order to attract more "quality tourism" a plan was made called Vestingstad Valkenburg (Fortification Town Valkenburg). Included in the plan were the restoration of two surviving city gates, the rebuilding of Geulpoort, a 14th-century city gate that was demolished along with the castle in the 17th century, and the reconstruction of the defensive moat along the Medieval wall in Halderpark. More or less simultaneously initiated was the redevelopment of the town's shopping district, finished around 2017.

The river Geul flooded its banks on 15 July 2021, causing considerable damage to bridges and buildings in the entire town centre.

Main sights
These days Valkenburg is known for its tourist attractions, chalk houses (locally called mergel or marl) and the hilly countryside. The main sight are: 
 Valkenburg castle, of which only a ruin remains;
 several other castles, castle farms and stately homes, mostly situated along the Geul river;
 Oud-Valkenburg, a small village along the Geul with a particularly picturesque ensemble of a gothic church, two castles (Genhoes and Schaloen) and several historic farmsteads, all in local marlstone;
 several watermills, two in the old town;
 parts of the city walls and two of three city gates survived (Berkelpoort and Grendelpoort; the third gate, Geulpoort was rebuilt in 2014);
 old court building (Spaans Leenhof);
 Saint Nicolas church, a Gothic church in Valkenburg with some late Medieval wood carvings;
 Saint Gerlachus church in nearby Houthem Sint-Gerlach, with Baroque frescos by Johann Adam Schöpf, painted on marl;
 several former marl quarries (locally called 'caves', although they are largely man-made), offering guided tours; some have interesting charcoal drawings and marl sculptures, one has been recreated as the catacombs of Rome (designed by Pierre Cuypers), another one as a coal mine; in the winter Christmas markets are held in some quarries;
 a  viewing tower (Wilhelminatoren) atop a hill, connected to the town below by aerial lift;
 Thermae 2000, a sauna and wellness resort;
 a Holland Casino branch, as well as a large park around it (Kuurpark);
 two amusement parks; one focusing on popular fairy tales (Sprookjesbos);
Valkenburg is situated in a part of the Netherlands that is known for its natural environment and historical buildings. The area, although quite hilly, is perfectly suited for walks or (mountain) bike tours.

Listed buildings in Valkenburg

Castles and stately homes in Valkenburg

Tourist attractions in Valkenburg

Cycling 
Valkenburg aan de Geul is famous for its cycling events. The city has hosted the UCI Road Cycling World Championship a record five times, in 1938, 1948, 1979 and 1998 and again in 2012. Since 2003, the city's Cauberg hill has been the finish of the Amstel Gold Race. The Tour de France had a stage finish in Valkenburg in 1992 and in 2006.

The Cauberg Cyclo-cross is a cyclo-cross race and a part of the UCI Cyclo-cross World Cup.

Population centres 

Apart from the city of Valkenburg (including the neighbourhood of Broekhem), the municipality of Valkenburg aan de Geul comprises the following villages and hamlets:
Berg en Terblijt, Vilt, Geulhem, Houthem, Sibbe, IJzeren, Oud-Valkenburg, Schin op Geul en Walem.

Transport

By car
Valkenburg aan de Geul is served by the A79 motorway, this motorway runs from Maastricht to Heerlen.

By train
Valkenburg aan de Geul has three train stations Valkenburg, Houthem-Sint Gerlach and Schin op Geul, operated by Arriva.

By bus
Valkenburg aan de Geul is served by Arriva buses

Notable residents

 Saint Gerlach (died c. 1170), hermit
 Beatrice of Valkenburg (c. 1254 - 1277), queen of Germany
 Pierre Cuypers (1827 – 1921), architect; spent a few years in Valkenburg
 Erich Wasmann (1859 - 1931), Austrian-born entomologist
 Jan Hanlo (1912 - 1969), poet and writer, grew up in Valkenburg
 Raymond Barion (born 1946) a Dutch artist, made in the form of paintings, sculptures and on paper
 Gerlach Cerfontaine (born 1946), business leader, CEO of Schiphol Group
 Marjon Lambriks (born 1949), soprano
 Rob Delahaye (born 1959) a Dutch former professional footballer with 359 club caps
 Camiel Eurlings (born 1973), politician, business leader, corporate director for KLM
 Rob Ruijgh (born 1986), racing cyclist

Panorama

References

External links 

 
Official website (in Dutch)

 
Municipalities of Limburg (Netherlands)
South Limburg (Netherlands)
Spa towns in the Netherlands